Jason Blicker is a Canadian film and television actor. He has had several small roles in television series including recurring roles on Robocop, F/X: The Series, State of Grace, NYPD Blue, and Boston Legal, as well as roles films such as Half Baked, The Day After Tomorrow and Hidden 3D.

Filmography

Film

Television

References

External links

Year of birth missing (living people)
Living people
Canadian male film actors
Canadian male television actors